This is a list of Cultural Heritage landmarks in the Province of Almería, Spain.

A
Álbum de estampas inglesas con el ex-libris de María Cristina, Reina de España
Alcazaba of Almería
Aljibe Bermejo
Almería Cathedral
El Argar y La Gerundia
Arte rupestre del arco mediterráneo de la Península Ibérica en Almería

B
Baños de la Reina (Celín)
Basílica de Nuestra Señora de las Mercedes (Oria)
Benizalón

C
Cable Inglés
Casa Fuerte de la Cruceta
Castillo de Guardias Viejas
Castillo de las Escobetas
Castillo de Huebro
Castillo de San Cristóbal (Almería)
Castillo de Santa Ana
Castillo de Tabernas
Castillo de Vélez-Blanco
Catedral de la Encarnación de Almería
Centro histórico de Almería
Cerro del Nacimiento
El Cerrón (Dalías)
Ciavieja
Círculo Mercantil e Industrial (Almería)
Convento de los Agustinos
Cortijo Nuevo
Yacimientos arqueológicos del Cerro del Espíritu Santo
Zona arqueológica del Cerro del Mojón
Zona arqueológica de El Chuche (Benahadux)

E
Epitolario de Felipe IV
Estación de Almería

F
Yacimiento arqueológico de Fuente Álamo (Cuevas del Almanzora)
Fundición de Santo Tomás (Almería)

G
Gérgal

H
Hospital de Santa María Magdalena
Huécija

I
Iglesia de Nuestra Señora de la Encarnación (Vera)
Iglesia de San Benito (Vícar)
Iglesia de Santa María (Tíjola)

L
Yacimiento arqueológico de La Ribera de la Algaida
Loma de Galera
Los Millares
Lugarcico Viejo (Antas)

M
Mausoleo romano de Abla
Despoblado de Los Millares

N
Necrópolis megalítica de Gádor

P
El Peñón de las Juntas
El Peñón de la Reina (Alboloduy)
Las Pilas-Mojácar la Vieja

S

Santuario del Saliente (Albox)

T
Terque
Torre de Cerrillos
Torre de Cárdenas
Torre de la Garrofa (Almería)
Torre de Macenas
Torre del Perdigal (Almería)
Torre García
Torres de vigilancia costera
Torreón de San Miguel (Almería)

Y
Yacimiento arqueológico El Villar

 
Almeria